Andreia Sforzin Laurence (born ) is a Brazilian female volleyball player.

With her club Rexona Ades she competed at the 2015 FIVB Volleyball Women's Club World Championship.

Clubs
  São Caetano (2001–2004)
  E.C. Pinheiros (2004–2006)
  GS Caltex (2006–2007)
  Osasco (2007–2008)
  São Caetano (2008–2009)
  Osasco (2009–2010)
  E.C. Pinheiros (2010–2014)
  Rio de Janeiro (2014–2015)
  SESI-São Paulo (2015–2016)
  Brasília Vôlei (2016–2017)
  Praia Clube (2017–2018)

Awards

Clubs
 2009–10 Brazilian Superliga –  Champion, with Sollys Osasco
 2014–15 Brazilian Superliga –  Champion, with Rexona-Ades
 2017–18 Brazilian Superliga –  Champion, with Praia Clube 
 2010 South American Club Championship –  Champion, with Sollys Osasco
 2015 South American Club Championship –  Champion, with Rexona-Ades

References

1983 births
Living people
Brazilian women's volleyball players
Place of birth missing (living people)
Opposite hitters
Sportspeople from São Paulo
21st-century Brazilian women